Clyde William Tombaugh  (February 4, 1906 January 17, 1997) was an American astronomer. He discovered Pluto in 1930, the first object to be discovered in what would later be identified as the Kuiper belt. At the time of discovery, Pluto was considered a planet, but was reclassified as a dwarf planet in 2006. Tombaugh also discovered many asteroids, and called for the serious scientific research of unidentified flying objects.

Early life 
Tombaugh was born in Streator, Illinois, son of Muron Dealvo Tombaugh, a farmer, and his wife Adella Pearl Chritton. After his family moved to Burdett, Kansas, in 1922, Tombaugh's plans for attending college were frustrated when a hailstorm ruined his family's farm crops.

Astronomy career
Beginning in 1926, he built several telescopes with lenses and mirrors by himself. To better test his telescope mirrors, Tombaugh, with just a pick and shovel, dug a pit 24 feet long, 8 feet deep, and 7 feet wide. This provided a constant air temperature, free of air currents, and was also used by the family as a root cellar and emergency shelter. He sent drawings of Jupiter and Mars to the Lowell Observatory, at Flagstaff, Arizona, which offered him a job. Tombaugh worked there from 1929 to 1945.

Pluto

It was at Lowell in 1930 that Tombaugh discovered Pluto. Following his discovery, Tombaugh earned bachelor's and master's degrees in astronomy from the University of Kansas in 1936 and 1938. 
While a young researcher working for the Lowell Observatory in Flagstaff, Arizona, Tombaugh was given the job to perform a systematic search for a trans-Neptunian planet (also called Planet X), which had been predicted by Percival Lowell based on calculations performed by his student mathematician Elizabeth Williams and William Pickering.

Starting April 6, 1929, Tombaugh used the observatory's  astrograph to take photographs of the same section of sky several nights apart. He then used a blink comparator to compare the different images. When he shifted between the two images, a moving object, such as a planet, would appear to jump from one position to another, while the more distant objects such as stars would appear stationary. Tombaugh noticed such a moving object in his search, near the place predicted by Lowell, and subsequent observations showed it to have an orbit beyond that of Neptune. This ruled out classification as an asteroid, and they decided this was the ninth planet that Lowell had predicted. The discovery was made on Tuesday, February 18, 1930, using images taken the previous month.

Three classical mythological names were about equally popular among proposals for the new planet: Minerva, Cronus and Pluto. However, Minerva was already in use and the primary supporter of Cronus was widely disliked, leaving Pluto as the front-runner. Outside of Lowell staff, it was first proposed by an 11-year-old English schoolgirl, Venetia Burney. In its favor was that the Pluto of Roman mythology was able to render himself invisible, and that its first two letters formed Percival Lowell's initials. In order to avoid the name changes suffered by Neptune, the name was proposed to both the American Astronomical Society and the Royal Astronomical Society, both of which approved it unanimously. The name was officially adopted on May 1, 1930.

Following the discovery, it was recognized that Pluto wasn't massive enough to be the expected ninth planet, and some astronomers began to consider it the first of a new class of object – and indeed Tombaugh searched for additional trans-Neptunian objects for years, though due to the lack of any further discoveries he concluded that Pluto was indeed a planet. The idea that Pluto was not a true planet remained a minority position until the discovery of other Kuiper belt objects in the late 1990s, which showed that it did not orbit alone but was at best the largest of a number of icy bodies in its region of space. After it was shown that at least one such body, dubbed Eris, was more massive than Pluto, the International Astronomical Union (IAU) reclassified Pluto on August 24, 2006, as a dwarf planet, leaving eight planets in the Solar System.

Tombaugh's widow Patricia stated after the IAU's decision that while he might have been disappointed with the change since he had resisted attempts to remove Pluto's planetary status in his lifetime, he would have accepted the decision now if he were alive. She noted that he "was a scientist. He would understand they had a real problem when they start finding several of these things flying around the place." Hal Levison offered this perspective on Tombaugh's place in history: "Clyde Tombaugh discovered the Kuiper Belt. That's a helluva lot more interesting than the ninth planet."

Further research
Tombaugh continued searching for over a decade after the discovery of Pluto, and the lack of further discoveries left him satisfied that no other object of a comparable apparent magnitude existed near the ecliptic. No more trans-Neptunian objects were discovered until 15760 Albion, in 1992.

However, more recently the relatively bright object  has been discovered. It has a relatively high orbital inclination, but at the time of Tombaugh's discovery of Pluto, Makemake was only a few degrees from the ecliptic, near the border of Taurus and Auriga, at an apparent magnitude of 16. This position was also very near the galactic equator, making it almost impossible to find such an object within the dense concentration of background stars of the Milky Way.  In the fourteen years of looking for planets, until he was drafted in July 1943, Tombaugh looked for motion in 90 million star images (two each of 45 million stars).

Asteroids 

Tombaugh is officially credited by the Minor Planet Center with discovering 15 asteroids, and he observed nearly 800 asteroids during his search for Pluto and years of follow-up searches looking for another candidate for the postulated Planet X. Tombaugh is also credited with the discovery of periodic comet 274P/Tombaugh–Tenagra. He also discovered hundreds of variable stars, as well as star clusters, galaxy clusters, and a galaxy supercluster.

The asteroid 1604 Tombaugh, discovered in 1931, is named after him. He discovered hundreds of asteroids, beginning with 2839 Annette in 1929, mostly as a by-product of his search for Pluto and his searches for other celestial objects. Tombaugh named some of them after his wife, children and grandchildren. The Royal Astronomical Society awarded him the Jackson-Gwilt Medal in 1931.

UFOs
Tombaugh was probably the most eminent astronomer to have reported seeing unidentified flying objects. On August 20, 1949, Tombaugh saw several unidentified objects near Las Cruces, New Mexico. He described them as six to eight rectangular lights, stating: "I doubt that the phenomenon was any terrestrial reflection, because... nothing of the kind has ever appeared before or since... I was so unprepared for such a strange sight that I was really petrified with astonishment.".

Tombaugh observed these rectangles of light for about 3 seconds and his wife saw them for about  seconds.  He never supported the interpretation as a spaceship that has often been attributed to him.  He considered other possibilities, with a temperature inversion as the most likely cause.From my own studies of the solar system I cannot entertain any serious possibility for intelligent life on other planets, not even for Mars... The logistics of visitations from planets revolving around the nearer stars is staggering.  In consideration of the hundreds of millions of years in the geologic time scale when such visits may have possibly occurred, the odds of a single visit in a given century or millennium are overwhelmingly against such an event.A much more likely source of explanation is some natural optical phenomenon in our own atmosphere. In my 1949 sightings the faintness of the object, together with the manner of fading in intensity as it traveled away from the zenith towards the southeastern horizon, is quite suggestive of a reflection from an optical boundary or surface of slight contrast in refractive index, as in an inversion layer.I have never seen anything like it before or since, and I have spent a lot of time where the night sky could be seen well.  This suggests that the phenomenon involves a comparatively rare set of conditions or circumstances to produce it, but nothing like the odds of an interstellar visitation.

Another sighting by Tombaugh a year or two later while at a White Sands observatory was of an object of −6 magnitude, four times brighter than Venus at its brightest, going from the zenith to the southern horizon in about 3 seconds. The object executed the same maneuvers as in Tombaugh's first sighting.

Tombaugh later reported having seen three of the mysterious green fireballs, which suddenly appeared over New Mexico in late 1948 and continued at least through the early 1950s. A researcher on Project Twinkle reported that Tombaugh "... never observed an unexplainable aerial object despite his continuous and extensive observations of the sky."

According to an entry in "UFO updates", Tombaugh said: "I have seen three objects in the last seven years which defied any explanation of known phenomenon, such as Venus, atmospheric optic, meteors or planes. I am a professional, highly skilled, professional astronomer. In addition I have seen three green fireballs which were unusual in behavior from normal green fireballs... I think that several reputable scientists are being unscientific in refusing to entertain the possibility of extraterrestrial origin and nature."

Shortly after this, in January 1957, in an Associated Press article in the Alamogordo Daily News titled "Celestial Visitors May Be Invading Earth's Atmosphere", Tombaugh was again quoted on his sightings and opinion about them. "Although our own solar system is believed to support no other life than on Earth, other stars in the galaxy may have hundreds of thousands of habitable worlds. Races on these worlds may have been able to utilize the tremendous amounts of power required to bridge the space between the stars ...". Tombaugh stated that he had observed celestial phenomena which he could not explain, but had seen none personally since 1951 or 1952. "These things, which do appear to be directed, are unlike any other phenomena I ever observed. Their apparent lack of obedience to the ordinary laws of celestial motion gives credence."

In 1949, Tombaugh had also told the Naval missile director at White Sands Missile Range, Commander Robert McLaughlin, that he had seen a bright flash on Mars on August 27, 1941, which he now attributed to an atomic blast. Tombaugh also noted that the first atomic bomb tested in New Mexico would have lit up the dark side of the Earth like a neon sign and that Mars was coincidentally quite close at the time, the implication apparently being that the atomic test would have been visible from Mars.

In June 1952, Dr. J. Allen Hynek, an astronomer acting as a scientific consultant to the Air Force's Project Blue Book UFO study, secretly conducted a survey of fellow astronomers on UFO sightings and attitudes while attending an astronomy convention. Tombaugh and four other astronomers, including Dr. Lincoln LaPaz of the University of New Mexico, told Hynek about their sightings. Tombaugh also told Hynek that his telescopes were at the Air Force's disposal for taking photos of UFOs, if he was properly alerted.

Near-Earth objects
Tombaugh's offer may have led to his involvement in a search for Near-Earth objects, first announced in late 1953 and sponsored by the Army Office of Ordnance Research. Another public statement was made on the search in March 1954, emphasizing the rationale that such an orbiting object would serve as a natural space station. However, according to Donald Keyhoe, later director of the National Investigations Committee on Aerial Phenomena (NICAP), the real reason for the sudden search was because two near-Earth orbiting objects had been picked up on new long-range radar in the summer of 1953, according to his Pentagon source.

By May 1954, Keyhoe was making public statements that his sources told him the search had indeed been successful, and either one or two objects had been found. However, the story did not break until August 23, 1954, when Aviation Week magazine stated that two satellites had been found only 400 and 600 miles out. They were termed "natural satellites" and implied that they had been recently captured, despite this being a virtual impossibility. The next day, the story was in many major newspapers. Dr. LaPaz was implicated in the discovery in addition to Tombaugh. LaPaz had earlier conducted secret investigations on behalf of the Air Force on the green fireballs and other unidentified aerial phenomena over New Mexico. The New York Times reported on August 29 that "a source close to the O. O. R. unit here described as 'quite accurate' the report in the magazine Aviation Week that two previously unobserved satellites had been spotted and identified by Dr. Lincoln LaPaz of the University of New Mexico as natural and not artificial objects. This source also said there was absolutely no connection between the reported satellites and flying saucer reports." However, in the October 10 issue, LaPaz said the magazine article was "false in every particular, in so far as reference to me is concerned."

Both LaPaz and Tombaugh were to issue public denials that anything had been found. The October 1955 issue of Popular Mechanics magazine reported: "Professor Tombaugh is closemouthed about his results. He won't say whether or not any small natural satellites have been discovered.  He does say, however, that newspaper reports of 18 months ago announcing the discovery of natural satellites at 400 and 600 miles out are not correct. He adds that there is no connection between the search program and the reports of so-called flying saucers."

At a meteor conference in Los Angeles in 1957, Tombaugh reiterated that his four-year search for "natural satellites" had been unsuccessful. In 1959, Tombaugh was to issue a final report stating that nothing had been found in his search. His personal 16-inch telescope was reassembled and dedicated on September 17, 2009, at Rancho Hidalgo, New Mexico (near Animas, New Mexico), adjacent to Astronomys new observatory.

Other ventures
During World War II he taught naval personnel navigation at Northern Arizona University. He worked at White Sands Missile Range in the early 1950s, and taught astronomy at New Mexico State University from 1955 until his retirement in 1973. In 1980 he was inducted into the International Space Hall of Fame. In 1991, he received the American Academy of Achievement's Golden Plate Award presented by Awards Council member Glenn T. Seaborg.

Later life
Direct visual observation became rare in astronomy. By 1965 Robert S. Richardson called Tombaugh one of two great living experienced visual observers as talented as Percival Lowell or Giovanni Schiaparelli. In 1980, Tombaugh and Patrick Moore wrote a book Out of the Darkness: The Planet Pluto. In August 1992, JPL scientist Robert Staehle called Tombaugh, requesting permission to visit his planet. "I told him he was welcome to it," Tombaugh later remembered, "though he's got to go one long, cold trip." The call eventually led to the launch of the New Horizons space probe to Pluto in 2006. Following the passage of Pluto by New Horizons on July 14, 2015, the "Heart of Pluto" was named Tombaugh Regio.

Personal life
Clyde Tombaugh had five siblings. Through the daughter of his youngest brother, Robert, he is the great-uncle of Los Angeles Dodgers pitcher Clayton Kershaw.

Tombaugh was an active Unitarian Universalist, and he and his wife helped found the Unitarian Universalist Church of Las Cruces, New Mexico.

Death
Tombaugh died on January 17, 1997, in Las Cruces, New Mexico, at the age of 90, and he was cremated. A small portion of his ashes was placed aboard the New Horizons spacecraft. The container includes the inscription: "Interred herein are remains of American Clyde W. Tombaugh, discoverer of Pluto and the Solar System's 'third zone'. Adelle and Muron's boy, Patricia's husband, Annette and Alden's father, astronomer, teacher, punster and friend: Clyde W. Tombaugh (1906–1997)". Tombaugh was survived by his wife, Patricia (1912–2012), and their children, Annette and Alden.

In popular culture
 Clyde Tombaugh's fame for his discovery of Pluto, was enough for him to qualify as a contestant on the October 24, 1956 episode of the game show I've Got A Secret.
 The 2006 release The Avalanche by musical artist Sufjan Stevens contains an instrumental track entitled "For Clyde Tombaugh".
 The ninth episode of the fourth season of Fargo featured a visit to a memorial marking the site of Tombaugh's boyhood home.
 Robert Heinlein's 1958 juvenile science fiction novel Have Space Suit – Will Travel features a scientific base on Earth's moon called Tombaugh Station.  When the hero arrives on Pluto he reflects

See also
 List of astronomers
 Tombaugh (crater)
 Tombaugh Cliffs
 Tombaugh Regio

References

Sources
 Falk, Dan, "More than a one-hit wonder", Astronomy, February 2006, 40–45.
 David H. Levy Clyde Tombaugh: Discoverer of the Planet Pluto (Tucson, Ariz.: University of Arizona Press, 1991). ; also Sky Publishing Corporation, March 2006.

External links

 Clyde Tombaugh papers at New Mexico State University
 Many biographical articles on Clyde Tombaugh
 
 Biography, Interviews, Photo Gallery of Clyde Tombaugh, achievement.org
 Illinois proposes a Pluto Day and reinstate Pluto as a Planet in honor of C. Tombaugh: Illinois General Assembly, Senate Resolution SR0046 2/26/2009

1906 births
1997 deaths
American astronomers
American Unitarian Universalists
Discoverers of asteroids
Discoverers of trans-Neptunian objects
New Mexico State University faculty
Northern Arizona University alumni
People from Flagstaff, Arizona
People from Las Cruces, New Mexico
People from Pawnee County, Kansas
People from Streator, Illinois
Planetary scientists
Scientists from Kansas
Space burials
University of Kansas alumni
Pluto